Pioneer Township is one of seventeen townships in Cedar County, Iowa, USA.  At the 2000 census, its population was 1,810.

History
Pioneer Township was established in 1848.

Geography
According to the USGS, it contains four cemeteries: Andre, Pioneer, Rose Hill and Union.

References

External links
 US-Counties.com
 City-Data.com

Townships in Cedar County, Iowa
Townships in Iowa
1848 establishments in Iowa